Jung So-ra (Hangul: 정소라; born March 10, 1991), also known as Sora Jung in the Western media, is a Korean beauty pageant titleholder who was crowned Miss Korea 2010 and represented her country in the 2011 Miss Universe pageant.

Early life
Jung is the daughter of the chairman of the Korean Chamber of Commerce in Shanghai and intends to become a diplomat. She graduated from Shanghai American School in the class of 2009. She had previous attended University of California, Riverside, but now she is currently attending Korea University. She speaks two languages: Korean and English.

Miss Korea 2010

After the pageant, Jung donated all her prize money to the International Vaccine Institute, an organization that develops and distributes vaccines in developing countries. "I made this decision to keep my promise to serve society when I was crowned Miss Korea," she said.

Miss Universe 2011
As the official representative of her country to the 2011 Miss Universe pageant, broadcast live from São Paulo, Brazil on September 12, 2011, Jung vied to succeed the then Miss Universe titleholder, Ximena Navarrete of Mexico, she was however unplaced in the title holders.

References

External links

 Miss Korea 2010 profile
 Miss Universe 2011 profile
 

1991 births
Living people
Miss Korea winners
Miss Universe 2011 contestants
South Korean female models
University of California, Riverside alumni
Korea University alumni